The Michoud fault is a geological fault that runs through eastern New Orleans.  The Michoud fault is the subject of extensive scientific inquiry into why Louisiana is losing vast tracts of land.

Subsurface mapping identified the Michoud fault, on the basis of well cutoffs and seismic surveys.  Sedimentary growth implies that movement along the Michoud fault has been intermittent since Oligocene time (Bebout and Gutierrez, 1983). A cross section in McBride (1998) shows a high-angle normal fault that was correlated by Dokka (2006) with the Michoud fault. This fault merges with a low-angle detachment fault at –7 km deep that developed along the top of a slightly south-dipping zone of weak salt and shale. These structures are considered to be related to a regional south-vergent extensional-contractional complex described by Peel et al. (1995; Fig. 1). Movement of the complex and thus on the Michaud fault reflects gravitational instabilities and down-dip motion during times of high sedimentation (Peel et al., 1995).

The Michoud fault belongs to a class of geologic structures known as  growth faults (Mauduit, T., Brun, J. P. 1998).  Growth faults are common geologic structures of regions undergoing high sedimentation rates, such as river deltas and passive margins.  They often develop where weak rock layers (detachments) such as salt, anhydrite, or shale underlie regions of rapid sedimentation.  These weak zones allow the growing mass of material above them to slide downhill, either continuously or episodically.  These downslope movements will be correspondingly experienced in the headwall region (such as that occupied by the Michoud fault) either as slow (barely perceptible) or rapid (catastrophic) subsidence.  Growth faults are also sometimes called "listric faults", implying that the fault is a concave-upward surface that transforms nearly vertical displacements at the surface into nearly horizontal ones at depth.

The Michoud fault is not unexpected or unusual as a geologic feature of the Mississippi River Delta.  Holocene faulting and tilting is widely recognized in many world deltas, such as the Nile, the Ganges-Brahmaputra, the Yangtze, the Po River, and the Rhine.

References
Bebout, D.G., and Gutiérrez, D.R., 1983, Regional cross sections, Louisiana Gulf Coast: Baton Rouge, Louisiana Geological Survey Folio Series 6, 10 p.
Dokka R.K., 2006. Modern-day tectonic subsidence in coastal Louisiana. Geology vol. 34, p. 281-284.
Hickey, M., and Sabate, R., eds.,1972, Tectonic map of Gulf coast region, U.S.A.: Tulsa, Oklahoma, Gulf Coast Association of Geological Societies and American Association of Petroleum Geologists, Scale 1:1,000,000
Peel, F.J., Travis, C.J., and Hossack, J.R., 1995, Genetic structural provinces and salt tectonics of the Cenozoic offshore U.S. Gulf of Mexico: A preliminary analysis, in Jackson, M.P.A., et al., eds., Salt tectonics: A global perspective: American Association of Petroleum Geologists Memoir 65, p. 153–175.
Törnqvist, T.E., Bick, S.J., van der Borg, K., and de Jong, A.F.M., 2006. How stable is the Mississippi Delta? Geology vol. 34, p. 697-700.
Mauduit, T., Brun, J. P. 1998. Growth fault/rollover systems: Birth, growth, and decay. J. Geophys. Res. Vol. 103, No. B8, p. 18,119-18,136.

References

External links
 Fault Motion Animation
 Tectonic control of subsidence and southward displacement of southeast Louisiana with respect to stable North America
 Baton Rouge - Denham Springs Fault System, Lake Pontchartrain

Structural geology
Geographic areas of seismological interest
Seismic faults of the United States
Geology of Louisiana